Kokiriidae is a family of insect in the order Trichoptera. It was discovered in 1964 and is found in Australia, Chile, New Caledonia, and New Zealand. It consists of fifteen species and six genera.

History
It was originally erected in 1964 as the subfamily of Kokiriinae and discovered the species Kokiria miharo, from New Zealand, but was soon reclassified as a family in 1967 by H. H. Ross and added the Chilean species, Rhynchopsyche fusca, to the new family.

Arturs Neboiss described the Australian species Tanjistomella verna and the New Caledonian genus Mecynostomella in 1974. In the same year, he described two other Australian genera, Taskiria and Taskiropsyche. O.S. Flint Jr. considered the species Rhynchopsyche fusca to be a junior synonym of the species Pangullia faziana. K.A. Johanson revised the genera, Mecynostomella, which increased the family size to fifteen species and six genera.

Larvae
The larvae are predatory and live on the small, sandy banks of streams and rivers. The larvae cases are made from sand and are depressed and slightly flanged around the edge of the case.

References

Bibliography
 Flint, O.S. Jr. (1967) Trichoptera collected by Prof. J. Illies in the Chilean subregion. Beiträge zur Neotropischen Fauna
 Johanson, K.A. (2003b) Revision of New Caledonian genus Mecynostomella (Trichoptera, Kokiriidae). Zootaxa.
 Neboiss, A. (1974) Additions to the family Kokiriidae (Trichoptera). Victorian Naturalist.
 Ross, H.H. (1967) The evolution and past dispersal of the Trichoptera. Annual Review of Entomology.

Trichoptera families